Capdenac is a railway station in Capdenac-Gare, Occitanie, France. The station opened in 1858 and is on the Brive–Toulouse (via Capdenac), Capdenac–Rodez and Cahors–Capdenac railway lines. The station is served by Intercités de nuit (night train) and TER (local) services operated by SNCF.

The line between Cahors and Capdenac was used by Quercyrail between 1993 and 2003 as a preserved railway, however the line is currently unused.

Train services
The following services currently call at Capdenac:
night services (Intercités de nuit) Paris–Orléans–Figeac–Rodez–Albi
local service (TER Occitanie) Toulouse–Figeac–Aurillac
local service (TER Occitanie) Brive-la-Gaillarde–Figeac–Rodez

Bus services

Bus services leave the station for Decazeville.

References

Railway stations in Aveyron
Railway stations in France opened in 1858